Joanna Hole (b 1955) is a British actress, best known for her role as Sally Markham in the 1980s BBC television drama series Tenko.

Other credits include: A Very Peculiar Practice, Miss Marple, The Upper Hand, Judge John Deed, Holby City and The Bill.

She also appeared in Gold, the third series in the Band Of Gold series written by Kay Mellor.

Filmography

Film

Television

External links
 

Living people
English television actresses
1955 births